Lauren Dahm is an American ice hockey goaltender, currently a member of the PWHPA.

Career 
Across 4 seasons with Clarkson, Dahm finished with a .568 winning percentage, a 1.72 GAA and a .928 SV%.

After graduating, Dahm originally retired from hockey, but returned in 2016 to play for the Boston Blades of the CWHL. She was drafted by the team 56th overall that year. Despite the team often finishing at or near the bottom of the league in three years there, she quickly became one of the most recognisable Blades players, with one of the heaviest workloads of all CWHL goaltenders. She set the league record for most saves by a goaltender in their debut with 54 saves in her first game against the Toronto Furies.

After the CWHL folded, Dahm joined the PWHPA. She had previously turned down an invitation to the American national team during the players' boycott in 2017.

References

External links
 Biographical information and career statistics from Elite Prospect

Boston Blades players
1989 births
Living people
Ice hockey players from New York (state)
American women's ice hockey goaltenders
Professional Women's Hockey Players Association players
21st-century American women